Spacked Out (Chinese title: 無人駕駛; Mo Yan Ka Sai) is a 2000 Chinese social realist film directed by Lawrence Ah Mon and produced by Johnnie To. It has a Category III rating in Hong Kong.

Plot
The film follows four teenaged girls around Tuen Mun in the New Territories of Hong Kong as the youngest of the group, 13-year-old Cookie, finds out that she may be pregnant, but her boyfriend has left for Mong Kok to sell bootlegged VCDs.

Awards
The film opened the 2000 Hong Kong International Film Festival in its world première. It received a "Films of Merit" award at the 7th Hong Kong Film Critics Society Awards in 2000.

References

External links

 HK cinemagic entry

Hong Kong drama films
2000 films
2000s Cantonese-language films
Films directed by Lawrence Ah Mon
2000s Hong Kong films